Álvaro Campos Estellés (born 1 April 1987) is a Spanish professional footballer as a goalkeeper.

Club career
Born in Mislata, Valencian Community, Campos was a Levante UD youth graduate, and made his senior debut with the reserves on 15 January 2006 by starting in a 0–0 Segunda División B home draw against CE Sabadell FC. On 30 July 2008, after loans at SC Requena and Ontinyent CF, he terminated his contract with the Granotas and joined Real Murcia; but only appeared for their B-team.

Campos left Murcia in 2010, and subsequently represented Cádiz CF, Albacete Balompié and CD Guadalajara in the third division. On 19 September 2014, he signed for CD Castellón in Tercera División,

On 30 July 2016, Campos agreed to a contract with Lleida Esportiu in the third division. On 17 August of the following year, he returned to former side Ontinyent, in the same category.

On 2 July 2018, Campos returned to Castellón on a two-year deal, with the side now in the division three. Roughly one year later, he renewed his contract until 2022, and contributed with 30 appearances in the 2019–20 season (play-offs included) as his side achieved promotion to Segunda División after a ten-year absence.

Campos made his professional debut on 12 September 2020 at the age of 33, starting in a 2–1 away win against SD Ponferradina but being substituted by Óscar Whalley due to an injury.

References

External links

1987 births
Living people
People from Horta Oest
Sportspeople from the Province of Valencia
Spanish footballers
Footballers from the Valencian Community
Association football goalkeepers
Segunda División players
Primera Federación players
Segunda División B players
Tercera División players
Atlético Levante UD players
Ontinyent CF players
Real Murcia Imperial players
Cádiz CF players
Albacete Balompié players
CD Guadalajara (Spain) footballers
CD Castellón footballers
Lleida Esportiu footballers